The 2011–12 Oregon State Beavers men's basketball team represented Oregon State University in the 2011–12 NCAA Division I men's basketball season. Head coach Craig Robinson was in his fourth year with the team. The Beavers played their home games at Gill Coliseum in Corvallis, Oregon and are a member of the Pac-12 Conference. They finished with record of 21–15 overall, 7–11 in Pac-12 play. They lost in the semifinals of the Pac-12 Basketball tournament to Arizona. They were invited to the 2012 College Basketball Invitational where they defeated Western Illinois in the first round and TCU in the quarterfinals before losing to Washington State in the semifinals.

2011 recruiting class

Roster

Schedule 

|-
!colspan=9| Exhibition

|-
!colspan=9| Regular season

|-
!colspan=9| Pac-12 tournament

|-
!colspan=9| CBI

Highlights
The Beavers upset Texas in the TicketCity Legends Classic.
The 100 points scored by the Beavers against Texas was the first 100-point game since 1997 and the 27th time in school history. It's also the first Beavers team coached by Robinson to score 100 points.
 The December 4 game against Montana was the first game with over 5,500 fans in a non-Pac-12 home game since the team played LSU in 2006.
 The January 7 quadruple-overtime 101–103 loss to Stanford was the longest basketball game in Oregon State history.
The team won 20 games for the first time since legend Gary Payton was a senior and posted just its second winning season since that same year back in 1989-90
The team pulled off the biggest upset in Pac-12 Tournament history when they knocked off No. 1 seed-Washington and advanced to postseason play for the third time in four years.
The Beavers led the conference in scoring for the first time ever and had their most 100-point games, 90-point games and 80-point games in school history, while leading the Pac-12 in steals for the third consecutive year.

References

Oregon State Beavers men's basketball seasons
Oregon State
Oregon State
Oregon State
Oregon State